Rupelmonde is a village in the municipality of Kruibeke, in the Belgian province of East Flanders. It stands on the bank of the river Schelde opposite the confluence of the eponymous Rupel, and is famed for its sundials as well as having what is probably Belgium's only tidemill. It is the birthplace of Gerardus Mercator, (1512–1594)  the Flemish cartographer, who was imprisoned for several months in the castle there, a remnant of which today serves as a museum.

The town holds a procession of civic giants on the first Sunday of August each year.

Gallery

References

Populated places in East Flanders
Kruibeke